Diego Borja Cornejo (May1, 1964) is an Ecuadorian economist and politician born in Quito, Ecuador. Between 2005 and 2006 he served as Minister of Economy and Finance. He was elected member of the National Constitutional Assembly on September 30, 2007. He resigned this position to be appointed Coordination Minister for Economic Policy on December 23, 2008

Political Leader 

Diego Borja is the Coordination Minister for Economic Policy of Ecuador, appointed on December 23, 2008. He is also National President of the "Movimiento Poder Ciudadano" (Citizen's Power Movement). He was elected a member of the Constitutional Assembly on September 30, 2007, as a candidate of the alliance between the social-democratic "Izquierda Democrática" (Party of the Democratic Left), the Poder Ciudadano Movement, and two other democratic socialist movements, "Acuerdo Democrático" and "Nuevo Acuerdo Nacional". He was elected as the first candidate in the Province of Pichincha, which includes the capital city of Quito.

Before forming "Movimiento Poder Ciudadano", Borja was a national leader of "Movimiento Nuevo País" (New Country Movement), where he was an adviser to Presidential candidate Freddy Ehlers, as well as alternate representative from Ecuador to the Andean Parliament.

Minister of Economy and Finance 

Borja served as Minister of Economy and Finance of Ecuador from December 28, 2005 to July 7, 2006. In that position he was named Governor of the Development Bank of Latin America (CAF), the Inter-American Development Bank, the International Bank for Reconstruction and Development or World Bank, and the International Monetary Fund.

Under his leadership, a reform of the Hydrocarbons Law (Ley de Hidrocarburos) was enacted so the Ecuadorian state could recover 50% of the revenues produced by private oil companies. Before this action, some private oil companies were contributing as little as 18% of their revenues to the public sector while earning profits of as much as 250% per year on their investments.

During his tenure, the Minister of Energy and Mines, Iván Rodríguez, decreed the expiration (caducidad) of the contract with the Occidental Petroleum Co., which was producing 100,000 barrels per day. The expiration was due to repeated violations of the contract and the Hydrocarbons Law. Minister Diego Borja was appointed to a high-level Commission to oversee the transfer and operation of the oil fields that were previously operated by Occidental Petroleum and was instrumental in creating the administrative unit formed to operate these fields.

Other key accomplishments of his tenure were the repurchase of $740 million of high interest rate bonds (Ecuador Global 2012, paying 12% annual interest), as well as a reduction in the overall public external debt stock (both in absolute terms, and also as a percentage of GDP, which fell below the target of 30% of GDP). Inflation and unemployment also fell during this period, and a projected fiscal deficit of 0.8% of GDP was reverted to a fiscal surplus of 1.4% of GDP. Economic growth was also significant, both in the oil and non-oil sectors.

Borja organized the CEREPS oil fund, to establish priorities in public sector investment, directing these funds towards infrastructure investment, the oil and electric sectors, education, health and the environment.

When Borja denounced a change that had been made to the regulations of the Hydrocarbons Law in an attempt to benefit the foreign oil companies, the chief of staff, Jose Modesto Apolo, asked for his resignation. Subsequently Borja denounced Apolo's role in the change to the regulations, and Apolo also resigned his office.

Professional accomplishments 
Borja earned a Master's degree from the Catholic University of Louvain and an Economic degree from the Pontificia Universidad Católica del Ecuador, at the latter he was also a professor. Before becoming Minister of Economy and Finance, Borja held several positions in the public, private, and academic sectors. He served as Executive Director of the Flower Producers and Exporters Association (Expoflores); President of the Catholic Student Federation (Federación de Estudiantes Universitarios Católicos del Ecuador-Quito, FEUCE-Q); consultant on competitiveness and productivity for several institutions. He is author of Opting for the Present. New Economy for a New Country (Optar por el Presente. Nueva Economía para un Nuevo País) (2005), as well as of studies on competitiveness and enhancing productivity in Ecuador.

Related links 

Official website

Web site of the Movimiento Poder Ciudadano

Blog of the Movimiento Poder Ciudadano

References 

1964 births
Living people
People from Quito
Pontifical Catholic University of Ecuador alumni
Academic staff of the Pontifical Catholic University of Ecuador
20th-century Ecuadorian economists
Democratic Left (Ecuador) politicians
PAIS Alliance politicians
Members of the Ecuadorian Constituent Assembly (2007–2008)
General managers of Central Bank of Ecuador
Government ministers of Ecuador
Ecuadorian Ministers of Finance
Catholic socialists
21st-century Ecuadorian economists